The Royal Belgian Academy Council of Applied Sciences (BACAS) is a Belgian council, which consists of the Flemish Academy Committee for Science and Technology (CAWET) and Walloon Comité de l'Académie pour les Applications de la Science (CAPAS) committees of the Flemish and French Academies of Science in Belgium. BACAS has ten members from the academy and ten from industry. The council studies the impact of technological development on society and provides advice for the Belgian government and leaders of industry.

As of 2008 those two committees have become both two full classes of both academies, meaning that the members will become full members, nominated by the King of Belgium, of the academy. For the French-speaking Academy, CAPAS became the Class of Technology and Society, while CAWET became the Class of Technical Sciences.

See also
 Academia Belgica
 Academia Europaea
 European Council of Applied Sciences and Engineering (Euro-CASE)
 Flemish Council for Science Policy
 Francqui Foundation
 National Fund for Scientific Research
 Science and technology in Belgium
 Science and technology in Flanders
 Science and technology in the Brussels-Capital Region
 Science and technology in Wallonia

External links
 CAPAS (French)
 KTW (Flemish)

Scientific organisations based in Belgium
Science and technology in Belgium
Organisations based in Belgium with royal patronage